Illusions on a Double Dimple is the second album by the German progrock group Triumvirat. It was a breakthrough for the band, which started to open shows in a U.S. tour for Fleetwood Mac. Triumvirat played the album in its entirety, and the tour resulted in increased popularity for the band in a number of countries. Triumvirat's popularity increased with their next release, Spartacus.

Track listing

"Illusions on a Double Dimple" – 23:25
"Flashback" (Fritz, Bathelt) – 0:57
"Schooldays" (Fritz, Bathelt) – 3:22
"Triangle" (Fritz) – 6:53
"Illusions" (Fritz, Bathelt) – 1:42
"Dimplicity" (Fritz, Bathelt) – 5:37
"Last Dance" (Fritz) – 4:53
"Mister Ten Percent" – 21:33
"Maze" (Fritz) – 3:03
"Dawning" (Fritz) – 1:02
"Bad Deal" (Fritz, Bathelt) – 1:40
"Roundabout" (Fritz) – 5:49
"Lucky Girl" (Köllen, Bathelt) – 5:14
"Million Dollars" (Fritz, Bathelt) – 4:42

Bonus Tracks (released together as a single):

"Dancer's Delight" – 3:32
"Timothy" – 4:08
"Dimplicity (edit)" – 3:15
"Million Dollars (edit)" – 2:35

Personnel

 Jürgen Fritz – Hammond organ, electric piano, Steinway grand piano, Moog synthesizer, Mellotron, producer, arranger
 Hans-Georg Pape - bass on illusions on a Double Dimple 
 Helmut Köllen – bass, acoustic & electric guitars on Mister Ten Percent, vocals on both sides
 Hans Bathelt – drums, percussions, lyrics

Session musicians 
 The Cologne Opera House Orchestra – orchestra
 Kurt Edelhagen Brass Section – brass
 Brigitte Thomas, Hanna Dölitzsch, Ulla Wiesner – backing vocals

References

1974 albums
Concept albums
Triumvirat albums
Harvest Records albums